Metabutethamine is a local anesthetic.

Benzoate esters